Carentoir is a commune in the Morbihan department of Brittany in north-western France. On 1 January 2017, the former commune of Quelneuc was merged into Carentoir. It is where the entertainment company Ubisoft was founded.

Demographics
Inhabitants of Carentoir are called in French Carentoriens.

See also
Communes of the Morbihan department

References

External links

Official site 

 Mayors of Morbihan Association 

Communes of Morbihan

Communes nouvelles of Morbihan